Amir Bagheri (born September 20, 1978) is an Iranian chess grandmaster. He was the second Iranian to achieve the grandmaster title.

He qualified for the FIDE World Chess Championship 1999 but did not play due to visa problems. He was knocked out in the first round of the FIDE World Chess Championship 2000.

Bagheri played for Iran in the Chess Olympiads of 1998, 2000 and 2008.

References

External links
 
 

1978 births
Chess grandmasters
Iranian chess players
Living people
20th-century Iranian people
21st-century Iranian people